Chariesthes antennata is a species of beetle in the family Cerambycidae. It was described by Karl Jordan in 1894. It is known from Equatorial Guinea, Nigeria, the Democratic Republic of the Congo, Gabon and Cameroon.

References

Chariesthes
Beetles described in 1894